Montijo   is a corregimiento in Montijo District, Veraguas Province, Panama with a population of 2,288 as of 2010. It is the seat of Montijo District. Its population as of 1990 was 4,341; its population as of 2000 was 4,545.

References

Corregimientos of Veraguas Province